The Pansong or Banseong Archipelago is a chain of islands located off the coast of Cholsan county, North Korea. The chain includes North Korea's largest island, Sinmi-do. 

The major islands in the archipelago are:

 Sinmi-to (신미도/身彌島)
 Ka-to (가도/椵島)
 Tan-to (탄도/炭島)
 Honggon-to (홍건도/洪建島)
 Taehwa-to (대화도/大和島), home to a small naval base at )
 Sohwa-to (소화도/小和島)
 Hoe-to (회도/灰島)

The archipelago also includes many smaller islands, including

 Nabi-som (나비섬)
 Uri-to (우리도/牛里島)
 Taekacha-to (대가차도/大加次島)
 Sokacha-to (소가차도/小加次島)
 Taedu-to (대두도/大豆島)
 Pugun-to (부군도/府郡島)
 Taejongjok-to (대정족도/大鼎足島)
 Kom-to
 Ung-to (웅도/熊島)
 Mugunjang-to
 Sari-yom (사리염)
 Chi-to (지도/芝島)
 Uri-to (우리도/于里島)
 Samcha-to
 Rap-to (랍도/蠟島)
 Sorap-to (소랍도/小蠟島)

References
 https://web.archive.org/web/20110719154813/http://sunsite.berkeley.edu:8085/korea/250k/NJ51_4.jpg
 http://www.cheonan.go.kr/cheonan/pride_4.asp?b_md=200&no=4167
 http://alldic.nate.com/search/krdic.html?q=%C3%B6%BB%EA%B1%BA&cm=c

Islands of North Korea
North Pyongan